The knockout phase of 2022 OFC Women's Nations Cup began on 23 July 2022 and finished on 30 July 2022 with the final.

All match times are local (UTC+12).

Format
In the knockout stage, extra time and penalty shoot-out are used to decide the winner if necessary.

Qualified teams
The top two placed teams from each of the three groups, along with the two best third placed teams, qualified for the knockout stage.

Bracket

Quarter-finals

Samoa vs New Caledonia

Papua New Guinea vs Tonga

Fiji vs Cook Islands

Tahiti vs Solomon Islands

Semi-finals

Samoa vs Papua New Guinea

Fiji vs Solomon Islands

Third place match

Final

References

2022 OFC Women's Nations Cup